Tung Choi Street is a street situated between south of Sai Yeung Choi Street and Fa Yuen Street in Mong Kok, Kowloon, Hong Kong. It is one of the most well-known street markets in Hong Kong. Its southern section, popularly known as Ladies' Market or Ladies' Street (女人街), sells various, low-priced products for women and also other general merchandise. Its northern section not far above Bute Street, has a wide variety of affordable plants, pet supplies and animals especially goldfish since it is also known as "Goldfish Street".

See also
 Men's Street
 List of streets and roads in Hong Kong

References

External links

Ladies Market Photo blog
http://www.tripadvisor.com.au/Attraction_Review-g294217-d1993236-Reviews-Goldfish_Street_Tung_Choi_Street-Hong_Kong.html

Mong Kok
Roads in Kowloon
Street markets in Hong Kong
Tourist attractions in Hong Kong